Christine Marie Løvmand (19 March 1803 – 10 April 1872) was a Danish artist who specialized in paintings of flowers and still lifes. She was one of the few women at the time who gained recognition as a painter.

Biography

As a child, Løvmand helped her sick mother look after the five children in the family. When her father died in 1826, she resolved to work hard to support the family. From 1824, both Christine and her sister Frederikke started to have painting and drawing lessons with the flower painter Johannes Ludvig Camradt. In 1827, the two sisters began to exhibit at Charlottenborg Spring Exhibition. From 1831 to 1834, Christine was one of Christoffer Wilhelm Eckersberg's students. The lessons were held on Sundays, probably because it was not possible for the professor to include her in his classes with male students.

Christine Løvmand was one of the few female painters during the Danish Golden Age. Her favorite subjects were flowers and fruits. The first official recognition she received came in 1827 when the Royal Collection first purchased one of her paintings. In 1842, she received a stipend from King Christian VIII which allowed her to study in Germany. In 1846, she was able to pay for a short study trip to Paris herself. She admitted that the study trips widened her understanding of art but had little effect on her own painting as nearly all her time was taken up with teaching.

For an extended period she instructed young women in painting in her own home. Among her students were the actress Johanne Luise Heiberg, the writer Benedicte Arnesen Kall and her cousin Eleonora Tscherning who also became a recognized painter.

She died on 10 April 1872 and is buried in Assistens Cemetery.

Selected works
En kurv med blomster og nogle vindruer på en piedestal (1827)
En kurv med frugter i et landskab (1832)
En buket blomster ved foden af et træ (1832)
Blomsterstykke (1841)
Frugter i et italiensk landskab (c. 1844)
Blomster på en sten
Tulipaner og aurikler (1858)
En krans af efterårets sidste blomsterflor (c. 1872)

References

External links

1803 births
1872 deaths
Danish still life painters
Danish women painters
Artists from Copenhagen
19th-century Danish women artists
19th-century Danish painters
Burials at Assistens Cemetery (Copenhagen)